

Artists and music
Mandalas was formed in the end of 1999 during the recording of its first album. A record label – Tsunami Music – was founded to release it. The main actors of this adventure are Kulyela (vocals, guitars, samplers) and D'vida (back vocals, beat box, good vibrations). Later on, Uris (a.k.a. JFK) joins the band with his keyboards.

History

Starting from zero but with a constant fight and a do-it-yourself attitude they have delivered 3 LP – Things Left Unsaid (‘99), The Golden Shore (‘03), Hydra Rising (‘06)- 2 EP and several singles, touring by Spain, France and Italy.

Its last work –Hydra Rising- have shocked everybody with a clash of styles which includes soul, pop, folk, funk and psychodelia, joining old and new, electronic and acoustic. Hydra Rising is its best work: 11 inspired gems of electronic soul-funk, folk-hop and psychodelia. The new Mandalas in state of grace delivering a 21 st. century Tsunami factory classic. A proof of it is its first single, The More I Try, extracted of the Hydra Rising album, a soul bomb hit which confirms its ascendent trajectory and prestige during  eight years of career.

Their recently released single – Barbarella On Acid – has been remixed by several DJs and bands, changing the original song from house to disco, from dark to noise music. The creation of this single represents the climax of numerous concerts they have played presenting their new album.

Discography

Things left unsaid (2000)
Metal magic zone / Dream machine EP (2000)
Ooze EP (2001)
The Golden shore (2003)
The more I try -Single-(2006)
Hydra rising (2006)
Barbarella on acid (2007)

External links
 Official website
  Mandalas MySpace

Musical groups established in 2001
Spanish alternative rock groups